State Route 455 (SR 455, also known as Tennessee Waltz Parkway) is a state highway and bypass around downtown Ashland City in Middle Tennessee.

History
The route traces its origins to a 1997 referendum in which voters of Ashland City voted yes to a 1/2 cent increase in sales tax with the proceeds going to build and maintain a new Bypass back around to SR 12. The route was completed in 2005.

Route description

The section of SR 455 south of SR 49/SR 249 is a narrow 2-lane highway, with the section north of SR 49/SR 249 being a 3-lane undivided highway. The entire highway passes through industrial areas and runs parallel to the Cumberland River.

Junction list

References

455
Transportation in Cheatham County, Tennessee